Crossing Europe is an international film festival in Linz, Austria, that takes place every year in April since 2004. It defines itself as a platform for young European film makers. The focus of the film selection lies on sociopolitical and youth cultural topics. Every year, about 180 films from more than 30 European countries are chosen to be shown on this six days long festival. Besides Viennale and Diagonale, Crossing Europe is the third biggest film festival of Austria with about 20.000 visitors every year.

Festival juries give away awards in several categories to European fictional and documentary films as well as to locally produced films. For the award competition, only the first or second film made by a director can be qualified. The main prize, the Crossing Europe Award, is endowed with €10,000.

The next date of the festival is from April 25 to 30, 2017.

Awards 

Following program sections and awards are part of the festival:

Notes

External links 
 Crossing Europe

Film festivals in Austria
Festivals in Linz
Film markets
April events
Recurring events established in 2004